Graphis itatiaiensis is a species of lichen in the family Graphidaceae. Found in Brazil, it was described as new to science in 2011.

References

Lichens described in 2011
Lichen species
Lichens of Brazil
itatiaiensis
Taxa named by Robert Lücking